Culkein Stoer is a remote former fishing village, centred on the Bay of Culkein, in Assynt in Sutherland, Scottish Highlands and is in the Scottish council area of Highland.

References

Populated places in Sutherland